Underwater People is the second album by The Samples.  It contained live material, demos, unreleased songs, and alternate versions. It was released on November 30, 1991, and re-released by What Are Records? in 1992.

Critical reception
MusicHound Rock: The Essential Album Guide called the album the band's best, writing that it "rises above the rest with lots of energetic reggae rhythms and more consistent songwriting."

Track listing
 Underwater People (Live)
 My Town (Meltdown) (Live)
 Braidwood
 Giants (Live)
 After the Rain (Live)
 Moonlit Treese (1987)
 Overthrow (Live)
 Feel us Shaking (Acoustic)

Lineup
 Sean Kelly (Lead Singer, Guitars)
 Andy Sheldon (Bass, Vocals)
 Al Laughlin (Keyboards, Vocals)
 Jeep MacNichol (Drums/Percussion)
 Charles Hambleton (Acoustic Guitar)
 Chat Charbuck (Congas on "Moonlit Treese")
 Branford Marsalis (Sax on "Giants")

References

1991 compilation albums
The Samples albums